Johannes (Hanns) Ernst Richard Lilje (20 August 1899, in Hannover – 6 January 1977, in Hannover) was German Lutheran bishop and one of the pioneers of the ecumenical movement.

Lilje was general secretary of the German Student Christian Movement 1924–34. He was involved in Confessing Church struggle in Nazi Germany from 1933 onwards. After World War II he became the bishop of the Evangelical Lutheran State Church of Hanover in 1947 until his retirement. He was also the presiding bishop of the United Evangelical Lutheran Church of Germany 1955–69, president of the Lutheran World Federation and World Council of Churches. He was also abbot of Loccum under title Johannes XI.

Following WWII Lilje authored "The Valley of the Shadow" about his experiences during his imprisonment by the Nazis.  He was at Dachau concentration camp before being transferred to Buchenwald where he was held in solitary confinement.  He was tortured to extract a confession as well as reveal names of other clergy who were working to rid Germany of Hitler.  Even his Bible was taken from him but he knew the scriptures well enough to find strength in various verses.  His favorite was Romans 14:8 "For whether we live unto the Lord or die unto the Lord; whether we live therefore or die, we are the Lord's!"

In 1964, Lilje consecrated Stefano Moshi, first presiding bishop of the Evangelical Lutheran Church in Tanzania.

References

Dictionary of the Ecumenical Movement. 
Historical Dictionary of Lutheranism. Günther Gassmann, Duane Howard Larson, Mark W. Oldenburg. Published by Scarecrow Press, 2001. 
Roy, Rev. Ralph Lord. "Passover and Easter promise victory over defeat.", Record-Journal, March 24, 2018.

External links
 

1899 births
1977 deaths
Lutheran primates
Members of Christian religious orders
Grand Crosses 1st class of the Order of Merit of the Federal Republic of Germany
People in Christian ecumenism
Protestants in the German Resistance
20th-century German Lutheran bishops